was a Japanese  manga magazine published by Shueisha. It was a sister magazine of Ribon, and was published from 1981 until 2006. New and up-and-coming Ribon manga artists often had their first short stories published in this magazine. Established Ribon manga artists who had a decrease in popularity also had short stories or short series in Ribon Original, and side stories to series currently running in Ribon were also in this magazine.  manga that are published in Ribon also concurrently ran in Ribon Original.

Ribon Original was first published quarterly from 1981. It switched to bimonthly in 1994 and remained as such until the magazine was cancelled due to poor sales. The last issue was the June 2006 issue.

Serializations

 The Style of the Second Love (1996)
 ChocoMimi (2003)

References

1981 establishments in Japan
2006 disestablishments in Japan
Bi-monthly manga magazines published in Japan
Defunct magazines published in Japan
Magazines established in 1981
Magazines disestablished in 2006
Magazines published in Tokyo
Quarterly manga magazines published in Japan
Shōjo manga magazines
Shueisha magazines